Flat Creek is a  long 2nd order tributary to the Deep River in Randolph and Chatham Counties, North Carolina.

Course
Flat Creek rises about 4 miles northwest of Harpers Crossroads, North Carolina in Chatham County and then flows southwesterly into Randolph County to join the Deep River about 2 miles southwest of Bennett, North Carolina.

Watershed
Flat Creek drains  of area, receives about 47.5 in/year of precipitation, and has a wetness index of 427.78 and is about 52% forested.

See also
List of rivers of North Carolina

References

Rivers of North Carolina
Rivers of Chatham County, North Carolina
Rivers of Randolph County, North Carolina